Madgulapally is a mandal in Nalgonda district, Telangana, India.

References

Villages in Nalgonda district